The Bulgarian Olympic Committee claims one gymnast, Charles Champaud, competed for the nation at the 1896 Summer Olympics. This makes Bulgaria one of the 14 nations to appear at the inaugural Summer Olympic Games. Champaud, a Swiss gymnastics teacher living in Sofia, is often included in Swiss results for the 1896 Games, which were held before the advent of National Olympic Committees.

Competitors
The following is the list of number of competitors in the Games.

Gymnastics

Champaud competed in three of the gymnastics events, winning no medals. The places of most competitors in these events are not known.

References
 

Nations at the 1896 Summer Olympics
1896
Olympics